Seán White (born 14 March 1995) is an Irish Gaelic footballer who plays at club level with Clonakilty. He is a former member of the Cork senior football team.

Career

White first came to prominence as a dual player with the Clonakilty club, while simultaneously lining out with Clonakilty Community College in the Corn Uí Mhuirí. At club level he has won several divisional titles at all grades of hurling and Gaelic football, while he also lined out in the 2021 Cork PSFC final defeat by St. Finbarr's. White first appeared on the inter-county scene as a member of the Cork minor football team in 2013. He later spent a period with the under-21 team and was at midfield when Cork lost the 2016 All-Ireland under-21 final to Mayo. White was added to the senior team as a development player in 2014, however, it would be another two years before he made his first competitive appearance. He was later joined on the team by his brother Mark. White left the Cork senior football team in January 2022.

Career statistics

Club

Inter-county

Honours

Clonakilty
West Cork Junior A Hurling Championship: 2012, 2015
West Cork Under-21 A Football Championship: 2013, 2014, 2015
West Cork Minor A Hurling Championship: 2013

Cork
Munster Under-21 Football Championship: 2014, 2016

References

External link

Seán White profile at the Cork GAA website

1995 births
Living people
UCC Gaelic footballers
Clonakilty Gaelic footballers
Clonakilty hurlers
Cork inter-county Gaelic footballers